Goa Island, locally known as Watólofu, also known as Saint George Island, is a small archetypal desert peninsula, with a flat rocky brown coral reef, outcrop with dense borderline vegetation, white sand beach and a lighthouse. It is surrounded by crystal clear water, home to a variety of tropical fishes. The island is uninhabited and located within Nampula Province in Mozambique.

Etymology
The origin of the name "Ilha de Goa" is derived from its location within the sea route of Goa, India. It was a base of the Portuguese Mozambican government between 1509 and 1662.

Landmark

The island has a solar powered lighthouse located at the entrance of the Mossuril Bay, it is used as a guide for the offshore vessels en route to Island of Mozambique and is still in service, run by the lighthouse keeper and his family that lived Goa, India for more than two decades. It is one of the oldest and popular lighthouses in Mozambique, built during the Portuguese Mozambique era in 1876 and is an oldest example of the robust square tower design of lighthouses in Zanzibar and the coast of German East Africa (now Tanzania).

It is accessible by the public, one can witness the panoramic view from the top of the lighthouse which is next to the island's beach.

Shipwreck
On July 7, 2011, the Goa and Sena islands were closed for tourism as a result of a shipwreck which resulted in 8 fatalities, six students and two missionary sisters of charity from Spain. The islands that were used for hosting parties, excursions and tours were halted operations and were used as a subject of study to determine the safety of receiving future tourists, announced Alfredo Matata, the president of the municipal council of Mozambique Island.

The case study was examined by a team of technicians from Instituto Nacional do Mar (INAMAR). A mass was celebrated in the Archdiocese of Nampula for the victims along with local awareness campaigns that were carried out to explain the islanders and tourists to immediately stop visiting these two islets.

References

External links
 Goa Island in Mozambique

Islands of Mozambique